Robert Caiming Qiu is a Chair Professor at Tennessee Technological University in Cookeville, Tennessee. He was named a Fellow of the Institute of Electrical and Electronics Engineers (IEEE) in 2015 for his contributions to ultra-wideband wireless communications.

Education and career
Qiu got his B.S. degree in electrical engineering at Xidian University in 1987. From 1987 to 1990, he studied for his M.S. at the University of Electronic Science and Technology of China, and, after obtaining it, enrolled into a Ph.D. program at New York University, where he remained until 1995. After graduation, Qiu began working at GTE Labs and by 1997 joined Bell Labs. In 2000, he became a founder and CEO of Wiscom Technologies, before becoming a professor at Tennessee Technological University in 2003. As of 2014, Qui serves as endowed chair professor at Shanghai Jiao Tong University.

References

External links

20th-century births
Living people
Chinese electrical engineers
Xidian University alumni
University of Electronic Science and Technology of China alumni
New York University alumni
Academic staff of Shanghai Jiao Tong University
Tennessee Technological University faculty
Fellow Members of the IEEE
Year of birth missing (living people)
Place of birth missing (living people)